Georgia's 55th Senate District elects one member of the Georgia Senate. Its current  (2019–20) representative for the 2019-20 session  is Democrat Gloria Butler.

References

External links 

DeKalb County, Georgia

Georgia Senate districts
Gwinnett County, Georgia